Gregory "Greg" Jonathon Stone (born 23 June 1961 in Perth, Western Australia) is an Australian actor who has appeared in films, television and on stage.

Early life
Stone was born in Perth, Western Australia to parents Roy and Jennifer Stone and grew up in Fremantle with his two siblings.

Career
Stone graduated from the National Institute of Dramatic Art in Sydney in 1983 and won a Helpmann Award and Green Room Award for Best Actor for his role of George W. Bush in David Hare's Stuff Happens directed by Neil Armfield in 2006. Other notable film roles are in The Bank with David Wenham and Anthony LaPaglia, Van Diemen's Land, Oranges and Sunshine and The Sunset Six.

Theatre
Considered one of Australia's finest stage actors, he has appeared in over 70 productions for many companies including Melbourne Theatre Company, Sydney Theatre Company, State Theatre Company of South Australia, Belvoir, Malthouse Theatre, Playbox Theatre Company, Black Swan State Theatre Company, Bell Shakespeare, Griffin Theatre Company and Q Theatre. He was nominated for Green Room Awards for his performances in Angels in America, Good Works, A Little Night Music, Beauty Queen of Leenane, Beneath Heaven, Night a Wall 2 Men, Blackbird (also a Helpmann nomination) and Clybourne Park. He was a founding member of the acclaimed Keene/Taylor Theatre Project and Artistic Associate at Playbox Theatre in 2004.

Music
He is the lead singer of the glam rock band Melody Lords.

Personal life
Stone lives in Melbourne, Australia and has two children, including actress Georgie Stone with actress Rebekah Robertson.

Stage

Filmography

Film

Short films

Television

Awards and nominations

References

External links
 

1961 births
Australian male film actors
Australian male stage actors
Australian male television actors
Helpmann Award winners
Living people
People educated at John Curtin College of the Arts
National Institute of Dramatic Art alumni
Male actors from Perth, Western Australia
20th-century Australian male actors
21st-century Australian male actors